Kuit Vaya is a populated place located within Fresnal Canyon, in Pima County, Arizona, United States. The name comes from the Tohono O'odham , meaning "mesquite well".

References

Populated places in Pima County, Arizona